A pincho (literally "thorn" or "spike"), pintxo or pinchu is a small snack, typically eaten in bars, traditional in northern Spain and especially popular in the Basque country, Navarre, La Rioja, Cantabria, and Asturias. They are usually eaten in bars or taverns as a small snack while hanging out with friends or relatives; thus, they have a strong socializing component, and in the Basque country and Navarre, they are usually regarded as a cornerstone of local culture and society. They are related to tapas, the main difference being that pinchos are usually 'spiked' with a skewer or toothpick, often to a piece of bread. They are served in individual portions and always ordered and paid for independently from the drinks. It is not impossible, however, for the same item to be called pincho in one place and tapa in another.

They are called pinchos because many of them have a pincho (Spanish for spike), typically a toothpick —or a skewer for the larger varieties— through them. They should not be confused with brochettes, which in Latin America and some parts of Spain are called pinchos too; in brochettes, the skewer or toothpick is needed to cook the food or keep it together.

Basque Pintxo
A typical snack of the Basque Country and Navarre, "pinchos" consist of small slices of bread upon which an ingredient or mixture of ingredients is placed and fastened with a toothpick, which gives the food its name "pincho," meaning "spike." Pinchos are usually eaten as an appetizer, accompanied by a small glass of young white wine (called txikito) or beer (zurito,  quarter of a pint). Pinchos are very common in the taverns of the Basque Country and in other nearby areas, such as Cantabria, La Rioja, northern Burgos, and Navarre, where a variety of pinchos is usually served on a tray at the bar.

In this type of pinchos, the toothpick is used to keep ingredients from falling off the bread and track the number of items the customer has eaten. Sometimes, differently priced pinchos have toothpicks of different shapes or sizes.

Almost any ingredient can be put on the bread, but those most commonly found in the Basque Country include fish such as hake, cod, anchovy; tortilla de patatas; stuffed peppers; and croquettes. Pinchos can be very sophisticated, sometimes consisting of very elaborate (and sometimes expensive) fish, seafood, or meats.

Pinchos are used as an excuse for socializing. Typically, a group of friends will go from one tavern to another, drinking small glasses of wine or beer and eating pinchos.

Pinchos morunos
Pinchos can also refer to "pinchos morunos," which consists of pieces of meat marinated in a mix of paprika and oil called "adobo" and roasted on a skewer.

See also
 Canapé
 Tapas
 Pinchitos
 Mixed grill
 Yakitori
 Brochette

References

External links

 Todopintxos. Recipes and pictures of pinchos and tapas.
 Página oficial del Campeonato de Pintxos de Euskadi que se celebra en Fuenterrabía

Appetizers
Basque cuisine
Spanish cuisine